Sundancer is a proposed space habitat built by Bigelow Aerospace.

Sundancer may also refer to:
 A participant in the Native American ceremony known as the Sun Dance
 Sundancer, a cape from the web serial Worm.
 Sundancer (album), an album by Fair Warning
 "Sundancer", a song from the Keldian album Heaven's Gate
 "Sundancer", an episode of the television series The Adventures of the Galaxy Rangers
 Sundancer I and II, solar-powered cars built for The Solar Car Challenge
 AMC Sundancer, a vehicle conversion based on the two-wheel drive AMC Concord and four-wheel drive AMC Eagle
 MS Sundancer, a previous name of the ship MS Svea Corona
 Verilite Sundancer, an early name for the Verilite Sunbird
 Williams-Cangie WC-1 Sundancer, an American racing biplane design

See also 
 Sundance (disambiguation)